"Solomon Grundy" is an English nursery rhyme. It has a Roud Folk Song Index number of 19299.

Lyrics
The rhyme has varied very little since it was first collected by James Orchard Halliwell and published in 1842 with the lyrics:

Short version

The words of a French version of the rhyme were adapted by the Dada poet Philippe Soupault in 1921 and published as an account of his own life:
PHILIPPE SOUPAULT dans son lit / né un lundi / baptisé un mardi / marié un mercredi / malade un jeudi / agonisant un vendredi / mort un samedi / enterré un dimanche / c'est la vie de Philippe Soupault

See also

 "Monday's Child", a traditional English rhyme mentioning the days of the week
 "Dashing Away with the Smoothing Iron", a traditional English folk song written in the 19th century about a housewife carrying out one part of her linen chores each day of the week

References

English nursery rhymes
English folk songs
English children's songs
Traditional children's songs
Songs about fictional male characters